Jann Carl is a co-host and part owner of the syndicated TV show Small Town Big Deal. Carl and her co-host, Rodney K. Miller, report on uplifting stories about people, places and events throughout communities big and small across the United States. The show first aired on September 6, 2012, on the RFD-TV cable network. Small Town Big Deal has aired almost 100 episodes since 2012 and is now viewed on network and local television stations in nearly 80 percent of the United States.

Carl is also well known for her 14 years at Entertainment Tonight. She is nationally respected for her interviews with influential newsmakers. Some of the most famous include Brad Pitt, Oprah Winfrey, Tom Cruise, Steven Spielberg, Tom Hanks, Diane Sawyer and Barack and Michelle Obama. She began as a news reporter at WLS in Chicago.  She later moved to Los Angeles, where she reported for KABC, and hosted KABC’s “Eye on L.A.” magazine show.

Throughout the late 1980s and early 1990s, Carl was the co-anchor with the late Los Angeles broadcast legend Hal Fishman at KTLA-TV where she earned three Emmys. Later, Carl was an executive producer of the show Sold! for the History Channel.

Carl has appeared on Candid Camera and America’s Next Top Model. She has co-hosted the “Oscar Countdown” Academy Award show, the Emmy pre-show, the Jerry Lewis MDA Telethon and the Tournament of Roses Parade on CBS and HGTV. 

Carl was born in Carthage, Missouri. She graduated from the University of Missouri School of Journalism. Carl has been associated with Muscular Dystrophy Association for more than 25 years. After co-hosting the MDA Labor Day Telethon in Los Angeles for eight years, she was chosen by Jerry Lewis as a national co-host in 1996. Carl says that MDA and those with muscular dystrophy "are a family." She marked her 17th year on the coast-to-coast broadcast in 2012.  She has also served on MDA's national board of directors, and as a national vice president.  MDA has recognized her contributions with the Directors’ Award and the Paragon Award. In addition to her service for the Muscular Dystrophy Association, Carl is a supporter of her alma mater, University of Missouri. She has performed as the school's tiger mascot as well as serving as Mizzou Homecoming Grand Marshal. Carl has also served as the master of ceremonies for the "Model Citizen" fashion shows. These shows benefit the MU Thompson center for Autisim and Neurodevelopmental Disorders. In November 2016, the University of Missouri Alumni Association awarded Carl the "Distinguished Service Award," the highest award bestowed upon a University of Missouri alum.

References

External links

Small Town Big Deal

Gwinnett Daily Post
http://growinggeorgia.com/news/2013/01/entertainment-tonights-jann-carl-joins-rodney-miller-hosting-rfd-tvs-small-town-big-deal/

1960 births
Living people
People from Carthage, Missouri
American infotainers
American television personalities
Missouri School of Journalism alumni